Rethinking Madness: Towards a Paradigm Shift In Our Understanding and Treatment of Psychosis (Sky's Edge Publishing, 2012) is a book by the psychologist Paris Williams which explores creative ways of dealing with madness (psychosis). Williams says that psychotic experiences, which cause significant distress, typically occur deep within the mind. Given  suitable conditions, this process can often result in a positive outcome, but Williams avoids the romantic notion that psychosis is always beneficial. Much of what Williams says is in close accord with a recovery approach.

Williams says that the term "psychosis" has many meanings, and the definitions that have been put forward are controversial. Even the DSM-IV-TR, says that "the term psychosis has historically received a number of definitions, none of which has achieved universal acceptance". 

Williams says that the diagnosis of schizophrenia is also the subject of much debate:
Despite over a century of intensive research, no biological markers or physiological tests that can be used to diagnose schizophrenia have been found, its etiology continues to be uncertain, and we don’t even have clear evidence that the concept of schizophrenia is a valid construct. However, diagnosis and treatment based upon the diagnosis continues unhindered by these serious problems.

See also
Elyn Saks
 David Oaks
 Stuart A. Kirk
 Robert Whitaker
 Peter Breggin
 Peter Lehmann
 Thomas Szasz
 Anatomy of an Epidemic

References

External links
Official website

Medical books
2012 non-fiction books
Books about schizophrenia